The Faculty of Land and Food Systems (LFS) (formerly Faculty of Agricultural Sciences, formerly Faculty of Agriculture) is one of the three founding Faculties at the University of British Columbia (UBC) in Vancouver, British Columbia, Canada.

The faculty's administrative home is the H.R. MacMillan Building, with other programs housed across the UBC Point Grey campus, and the Lower Mainland of British Columbia.

The faculty's academic and research programs focus on the relationships between land, food, and natural resource use, both at a local level, and within a global context. The faculty is also home to the Centre for Sustainable Food Systems at UBC Farm. Research  by faculty and students covers a breadth of subjects, including soil, water and air use, food security, nutrition, food safety, food economics, agriculture, viticulture, animal welfare, food microbiology and aquaculture.

The faculty awards a Bachelor of Science (B.Sc.) for all undergraduate programs, and Master of Science (M.Sc.), Master of Food Science (MFS), Master of Food and Resource Economics (MFRE), and Doctorate (Ph.D.) at the graduate level.

History
In 1914 Leonard Klinck, Professor of Cereal Husbandry at Macdonald College, McGill University, was appointed as UBC's first Dean of Agriculture. During UBC's first two sessions Dr. Klinck taught a general course in agriculture, which was open to 3rd and 4th year Arts students. In 1915 the university opened in temporary headquarters at the former McGill University College of British Columbia facilities adjacent to Vancouver General Hospital. There were three faculties; Arts and Science, Applied Science, and Agriculture. Total student enrolment was 379 and full- and part-time faculty totalled 34. The first students in Agriculture were enrolled in 1917/18. By then the Faculty of Agriculture consisted of four departments: Agronomy, Animal Husbandry, Horticulture and Poultry Husbandry.

In 1969, under Dean Michael Shaw, the Faculty of Agriculture became the Faculty of Agricultural Sciences, to reflect its strong emphasis on science in its teaching and research programs.

In 2005, under Dean Moura Quayle, the Faculty of Agricultural Sciences became the Faculty of Land and Food Systems, to better reflect its focus on sustainability and interdisciplinary research, including food and resource economics, food science, human nutrition, and animal, soil, and plant sciences.

Undergraduate programs
Applied Biology (formerly Agroecology)
Applied Animal Biology
Sustainable Agriculture and Environment
Food, Nutrition and Health
Dietetics
Food Market Analysis
Food Science
Nutritional Sciences
Food and Nutritional Sciences
Food, Nutrition and Health
Global Resource Systems

Graduate programs
Applied Animal Biology
Food and Resource Economics (Professional)
Food Science (both Professional and research-based programs)
Human Nutrition
Integrated Studies in Land and Food Systems
Land and Water Systems (Professional)
Plant Science
Soil Science

Research centres and groups
Animal Welfare Program
Biometeorology and Soil Science Group
Centre for Sustainable Food Systems at UBC Farm
Food and Resource Economics Group
Food Science Research Group
Human Nutrition Group
Centre for Aquaculture & Environmental Research (CAER)
Dairy Education & Research Centre
Wine Research Centre

References 

University of British Columbia
Agricultural research institutes
Agricultural organizations based in Canada